The Bamboo Parachute is the debut solo spoken word album by former Deftones bassist Chi Cheng. It is his only solo album to be released during his life.

The album was available directly from Deftones’ official website and could also be purchased at shows on their 2000 tour promoting White Pony.

Track listing

References

2000 debut albums
Spoken word albums by American artists